Mahatma Gandhi Government Arts College, Mahe, (MGGAC Mahe, French: Collège des arts du gouvernement Mahatma Gandhi) is a general degree college located in Chalakkara, Mahé, Puducherry. It was established in the year 1970. The college is affiliated with Pondicherry University. This college offers different courses in arts, commerce and science.

Departments

Department of Physics

Department of Chemistry

Department of Mathematics

Department of Zoology

PG Department of Botany

Department of Computer Science

Department of Commerce

Department of Economics

Department of English

PG Department of Hindi

Department of Malayalam

Accreditation
The college is  recognized by the University Grants Commission (UGC).

Notable alumni
 Kodiyeri Balakrishnan, Politician, Former Minister of Home Affairs State of Kerala

References

External links
Mahatma Gandhi Government Arts College, Mahe - official website
MGGAC Mahe on the Mahe district website

Universities and colleges in Puducherry
Educational institutions established in 1970
1970 establishments in Pondicherry
Colleges affiliated to Pondicherry University